Earnest Brown IV (born January 8, 1999) is an American football defensive end for the Los Angeles Rams of the National Football League (NFL). He was selected with the 174th pick of the 2021 NFL Draft. He played college football at Northwestern.

College career
Brown was ranked as a fourstar recruit by 247Sports.com coming out of high school. He committed to Northwestern on March 22, 2016.

Professional career

Brown was drafted by the Los Angeles Rams with the 174th pick in the fifth round of the 2021 NFL Draft on May 1, 2021. On May 16, 2021, he signed his four-year rookie contract with Los Angeles. He was waived on August 31, 2021 and re-signed to the practice squad the next day. Brown won Super Bowl LVI when the Rams defeated the Cincinnati Bengals. 

On February 15, 2022, Brown signed a reserve/future contract with the Rams. He was waived on August 30, 2022 and signed to the practice squad the next day. He was promoted to the active roster on December 24.

References

External links
Northwestern bio

1999 births
Living people
People from Denton County, Texas
Players of American football from Texas
Sportspeople from the Dallas–Fort Worth metroplex
American football defensive linemen
American football linebackers
Northwestern Wildcats football players
Los Angeles Rams players